Jiangdong is a town located in Chao'an District, Chaozhou, in eastern Guangdong province, China. The town is located on an island surrounded by the water of the Han River, and enjoys a humid climate. As a result, it is nicknamed "Xizhong". The town is largely agrarian, and is known for food products. It is also the home of Zhenmei Food Group Company.

History 
In 1958, the Jiangdong People's Commune was established. In 1983, the status of people's commune was revoked, and Jiandong briefly became a county-governed district. This status was revoked in 1987, when it became a town, which it remains today.

Geography

Jiangdong is located in the southeast of Chao'an District, in Chaozhou, Guangdong province,  from the district's center. The town is situated on an island in the lower reaches of the Han River, and is commonly known as "Xizhong".

The town is also close to Chenghai District and the Shantou Special Economic Zone.

Administrative divisions 
Jiangdong administers 1 residential community and 29 administrative villages. In addition, Zhengdong contains 48 natural villages, which hold no administrative jurisdiction. The town's government is located in Zhongzhuang Village.

The town's sole residential community is Jiangdong North Street Community.

The town's administrative villages are as follows:

 Shangshuitou Village
 Xiashuitou Village
 Youhang Village
 Youyuan Village
 Yuanxiang Village
 Tingtou Village
 Cuntou Village
 Zhoudong Village
 Yangguang Village
 Xianpingtian Village
 Dongguang Village
 Sanwu Village
 Dushu Village
 Shangzhuang Village
 Zhongzhuang Village
 Xiazhuang Village
 Jingmei Village
 Yuanshan Village
 Longkou Village
 Hongsha Village
 Xianzhou Village
 Dutou Village
 Zhangcuozhou Village
 Xiedu Village
 Xiqianxi Village
 Dongqianxi Village
 Pengdong Village
 Shecuozhou Village
 Xiahu Village

Demographics 
Jiangdong had a population of 72,205 as of 2008, up from the 2000 Chinese Census, where Jiangdong had a recorded population of 66,145. A 1996 estimate of Jiangdong's population put the total figure at about 67,000.

Approximately 30,000 overseas Chinese hail from Jiangdong, most of whom live in Hong Kong, Macau, and Taiwan.

Economy 
Jiangdong's economy is notably for its relative absence of heavy industry. Instead, much of the town's economy is focused around agriculture, light industry, and various services.

Agriculture
Jiangdong has a large agricultural sector, with major crops including sugarcane, peanuts, bamboo shoots, daikon radishes, bananas, oranges, and miscellaneous vegetables. 22,400 mu of Jiangdong is farmland. Beginning in the late 1990s, Jiangdong served as an agricultural research center, and during the early 2000s, the town government improved the town's water and electrical infrastructure to further the town's agricultural research.

Climate

Jiangdong, located in the downstream of Han River, has fertile soil sources and abundant water. The town's climate is conducive to agriculture.

According to the topography of the whole town, Jiangdong town is divided into two parts, the south part and the north part. Most of the soils in the north part belong to property of sediment. On the contrary, the cultivated land of the south part is more likely to be clay. After all the town is so small that it does not cause many difference between them. Generally speaking, most of the crops are the same between these two parts.

Local products

Jiangdong is well known for its bamboo shoots. The town is fit for growing bamboo shoots, as there is enough water, fertile soil, and a climate for doing so. Bamboo shoots from Jiangdong are reputed for their fresh meat, nice smell and sweet taste. In Chaozhou, Jiangdong is well known for the bamboo shoots, and Pengdong Village is one of the largest area in Jiangdong for planting bamboo shoots. The village has been planting bamboo shoots for at least several decades. It is said that there is more than households among the whole 600 households planting bamboo shoots. In recent years, this village changed its way from developing sporadic planting to large-scale cultivating, improving the total yield of bamboo shoots, and their economics benefits.

Dried turnip is also one of the famous food products of Jiangdong. In the Chaoshan area, southern Fujian, Taiwan, Meizhou, Fengshun County and other regions are called the radish dry salted. Furthermore, together with fish sauce and pickle, these three are the most famous cuisine in Chaoshan.

Industry

Light industry
Due to Jiangdong's size and location, the town has developed light industry rather than the heavy industry. Light industries in Jiangdong include embroidery, clothing, handicrafts, building materials, electrical appliances, and ceramics. The island is without major industrial pollution.

Zhenmei Food Group
Guangdong Zhenmei Food Group, officially known as Guangdong Zhenmei Food Group Co., Ltd., is headquartered in Jiangdong. Founded in 1991, Zhenmei Food Group produces various Chinese meat and seafood products. The company is also engaged in scientific research, animal breeding, and food processing. The company has registered capital of 33 million yuan, and existing fixed assets of 150 million Yuan. The Group has three affiliated companies, two research centers, one provincial-level agricultural science and technology innovation center, and four production plants. Generally speaking, its products are export-oriented and are mainly sold to Hong Kong, Singapore, and other southeast Asian regions and countries.

Services 
There are a number of private transportation service enterprises located in Jiangdong.

Scenic Areas

Sanyuan Pagoda
 is located on carp mountain, in Jiangdong. It is also known as the water tower, because it was built on rivers and streams where the water moves quickly. Its construction dates back to 1605, during the Ming dynasty. It is 51 meters high, and has seven floors and eight sides. The base of the tower is made of granite stone. The pagoda is carved with tigers, lions and other animals. The Han River just flows through in front of it, and the tower offers are scenic view of Jiangdong.

Transportation 
The town is connected to the mainland via the Jiangdong Bridge, which goes from western portion of the island to the mainland. Major roads in Jiangdong include Dongzhi Road and Zhongheng Road.

Jiangdong is about a 30 minutes drive away from Jieyang Chaoshan Airport and Chaoshan railway station.

References

External links
 江东镇人民政府官网
 广东真美集团

Towns in Guangdong
Chaozhou